Taizō, Taizo or Taizou (written: 泰三, 泰造, 大造 or 太蔵) is a masculine Japanese given name. Notable people with the name include:

, Japanese comedian and actor
, Japanese war photographer
, Japanese businessman
, Japanese footballer and manager
Taizô Kawashima, Japanese production designer and art director
, Japanese politician
, Japanese businessman
, Japanese equestrian
, Japanese politician

See also
Taizō-in, a Zen Buddhist temple in Kyoto, Japan
Taizhou (disambiguation)

Japanese masculine given names